MLB 2004 is a video game based on Major League Baseball. It was released on April 12, 2003, for the PlayStation and PlayStation 2. Known in Japan as MLB 2003, it was developed by Sony Computer Entertainment America and published under the 989 Sports label.

Vin Scully and Dave Campbell provide commentary for the game. On the cover is Los Angeles Dodgers player Shawn Green. MLB 2004 features Career, Spring Training, Home Run Derby, Manager, and Franchise modes.

The game was preceded by MLB 2003 and succeeded by MLB 2005.

Reviews
 GameSpot - Mar 18, 2003
 GamePro - Mar 12, 2003
 GameSpy - Apr 01, 2003
 IGN - Mar 14, 2003
 Game Revolution - Mar, 2003

References

External links
 
 

2003 video games
Major League Baseball video games
PlayStation (console) games
PlayStation 2 games
Video games developed in the United States
Video games set in 2004